The following lists events that happened during 1953 in Australia.

Incumbents

Monarch – Elizabeth II
Governor-General – William McKell (until 8 May), then Sir William Slim
Prime Minister – Robert Menzies
Chief Justice – Sir Owen Dixon

State Premiers
Premier of New South Wales – Joseph Cahill
Premier of Queensland – Vince Gair
Premier of South Australia – Thomas Playford IV
Premier of Tasmania – Robert Cosgrove
Premier of Victoria – John Cain I
Premier of Western Australia – Ross McLarty (until 23 February), then Albert Hawke

State Governors
Governor of New South Wales – Sir John Northcott
Governor of Queensland – Sir John Lavarack
Governor of South Australia – Sir Robert George (from 23 February)
Governor of Tasmania – Sir Ronald Cross, 1st Baronet
Governor of Victoria – Sir Dallas Brooks
Governor of Western Australia – Sir Charles Gairdner

Events

 20 March – The Television Act is passed by parliament, setting regulations for the broadcast of television in Australia, although television transmission did not commence until 1956.
 2 June – Elizabeth II's coronation as Queen of Australia takes place at Westminster Abbey 
 29 October – British Commonwealth Pacific Airlines Douglas DC-6, registration VH-BPE, en route from Sydney, crashes on approach to San Francisco, killing 19 people.
 4 December – Oil is discovered in the Exmouth Gulf off the coast of Western Australia.

Science and technology
The first town to fluoridate the water supply in Australia was Beaconsfield, Tasmania.

Arts and literature

 John Brack paints Men's Wear and The New House in Oakleigh, Victoria
 Ivor Hele wins the Archibald Prize with his portrait of Sir Henry Simpson Newland
 Michael Kmit wins the Blake Prize for Religious Art with his work The Evangelist John Mark

Sport

 Athletics
 26 September – Roland Guy wins the men's national marathon title, clocking 2:24:48 in Sydney.
 Cricket
 South Australia wins the Sheffield Shield
 Football
 23 May: Fitzroy go within ten minutes of a team score of 0.0 (0), which would have been a VFL first, against Footscray in appalling conditions. Allan Ruthven kicks a late goal to save them from this ignominy.
 1 August: Collingwood end Geelong's record 26-game unbeaten streak, which still stand, when they win 10.15 (75) to 7.13 (55).
 South Australian National Football League premiership: won by West Torrens
 Victorian Football League premiership: Collingwood defeated Geelong 77–65
 Rugby league
 Brisbane Rugby League premiership: Souths defeated Easts 21–4
 1953 NSWRFL season ends with South Sydney defeating St. George 31–12 in the Grand Final
1953 American All Stars tour of Australia and New Zealand takes place with the Americans playing matches hosted by various Australian teams including the New South Wales Blues and Queensland Maroons.
 Golf
 Australian Open: won by Norman Von Nida
 Australian PGA Championship: won by Ossie Pickworth
 Horse Racing
 My Hero wins the Caulfield Cup
 Hydrogen wins the Cox Plate
 Wodalla wins the Melbourne Cup
 Motor Racing
 The Australian Grand Prix was held at Albert Park and won by Doug Whiteford driving a Talbot-Lago
 Tennis
 Australian Open men's singles: Ken Rosewall defeats Mervyn Rose 6–0 6–3 6–4
 Australian Open women's singles: Maureen Connolly defeats Julie Sampson Haywood 6–3 6–2
 Davis Cup: Australia defeats the United States 3–2 in the 1953 Davis Cup final
 Wimbledon: Lew Hoad and Ken Rosewall win the Men's Doubles
 Yachting
 Solveig IV takes line honours and Ripple wins on handicap in the Sydney to Hobart Yacht Race

Births
 16 January – Vic Aanensen, Australian rules football player
 4 February – Pam Allan, politician
 5 February – Rod Jones, Australian novelist
 14 February – Greg Browning, field hockey player
 4 March – Ray Price, rugby league footballer
 7 March – Peter Webb, politician
 15 March – Randall Goff, water polo player
 17 March – Margaret Jackson, businesswoman
 12 April – Mike Munro, journalist
 16 April – Peter Garrett, singer and politician
 21 April
 John Brumby, politician
 Ron Hoenig, politician and barrister
 30 April – Craig Baumann, politician
 2 May – Chris Anderson, rugby league footballer and coach
 8 May
 Linda Dessau, 29th Governor of Victoria (2015–present)
 Tony Doyle, politician (died 1994)
 20 May – Robert Doyle, politician
 16 June – Sandra Nori, politician
 24 June – Michael Tuck, Australian Rules football player
 1 July
 David Gulpilil, actor (died 2021)
 Allan Shearan, politician
 13 July – Andrew Tink, politician
 21 July – Jeff Fatt, musician (The Cockroaches and The Wiggles)
 23 July – Geoff Corrigan, politician
 17 August – Noni Hazlehurst, actress
 26 August – General David Hurley, AC, DSC, Chief of the Defence Force (2011–2014)
 11 September – Renée Geyer, singer (died 2023)
 27 September – Greg Ham, musician (Men at Work) (died 2012)
 13 November – Bob Brett, tennis coach (died 2021)
 25 November – Graham Eadie, rugby league footballer
 12 December – Martin Ferguson, politician

Deaths

 28 January – James Scullin, 9th Prime Minister of Australia (b. 1876)
 12 February – Sir Hal Colebatch, 12th Premier of Western Australia (born in the United Kingdom) (b. 1872)
 18 February – Denis Lutge, rugby league and union footballer (b. 1879)
 6 March – Stephen Moreno, composer (born in Spain and died in France) (b. 1889)
 2 May – Trevor Oldham, 13th Deputy Premier of Victoria (died in India) (b. 1900)
 22 May – Louis Lavater, composer (b. 1867)
 25 August – Jessie Aspinall, doctor, first female junior medical resident at the Royal Prince Alfred Hospital (b. 1880)
 1 September – Bernard O'Dowd, journalist, author, and poet (b. 1866)
 2 December – Reginald Baker, athlete, sports promoter and film actor (died in the United States) (b. 1884)
 20 December – King O'Malley, Tasmanian politician (born in the United States) (b. 1858)

See also
 List of Australian films of the 1950s

References

 
Australia
Years of the 20th century in Australia